was a Japanese author associated with the Japanese proletarian literature movement. 

He spent time in jail due to his involvement with the labor movement, but later turned away from Marxism and became an enthusiastic supporter of Japanese imperialism.

See also 
 Japanese literature
 List of Japanese authors

References

1894 births
1945 deaths
Japanese writers
Writers from Fukuoka Prefecture
Proletarian literature